Cicindela bellissima, the Pacific coast tiger beetle, is a species of flashy tiger beetle in the family Carabidae. It is found in North America.

Subspecies
These three subspecies belong to the species Cicindela bellissima:
 Cicindela bellissima bellissima Leng, 1902
 Cicindela bellissima columbica Hatch
 Cicindela bellissima frechini Leffler, 1979

References

Further reading

 
 

bellissima
Articles created by Qbugbot
Beetles described in 1902